The 2019–20 Deutsche Eishockey Liga season was the 26th season since the founding of the Deutsche Eishockey Liga running from 13 September 2019 to 10 March 2020. The season was ended prematurely due to the COVID-19 pandemic in Germany, and EHC Red Bull München, which had won the regular season, was selected by the DEL for the 2020–21 Champions Hockey League, as final regular season standings in lieu of playoffs were used to determine DEL nominations to the league.

The season saw the same 14 teams as the previous year, as all teams were given a license.

Teams

Regular season

Standings

Results

Matches 1–26

Matches 27–52

Playoffs
The playoffs were cancelled as a result of the COVID-19 pandemic in Germany.

Statistics

Scoring leaders
List shows the top skaters sorted by points, then goals.

Leading goaltenders
Only the top five goaltenders, based on save percentage, who have played at least 40% of their team's minutes, are included in this list.

References

External links
Official website

2019–20
DEL
2019–20 in German ice hockey
Ice hockey events curtailed due to the COVID-19 pandemic